The 2003–04 Turkish Cup was the 42nd edition of the annual tournament that determined the association football Super League (Süper Lig) Turkish Cup champion under the auspices of the Turkish Football Federation (TFF). Trabzonspor defended its 41st edition achievement in a rematch with Gençlerbirliği 4–0. The results of the tournament also determined which clubs would be promoted or relegated.

Qualifying round

|}

First round

|}

Second round

|}

Bracket

Quarter-finals

|}

Semi-finals

Summary table

|}

Matches

Final

References

External links
 Turkish Football Federation 
 https://web.archive.org/web/20120420121849/http://www.turkfutbolu.net/turkiyekupalari/tr03tc.html – Turkey Cup Archive

2003-04
Cup
2003–04 domestic association football cups